The Blame  Stakes is a Grade III American Thoroughbred horse race for four-year-olds and older over a distance of  miles on the dirt scheduled annually in late May or early June at Churchill Downs in Louisville, Kentucky. The event currently offers a purse of $200,000.

History

The event is named after Blame, the 2006 U.S. Champion Older Male Horse who won the 2010 Breeders' Cup Classic at Churchill Downs. In February 2020, Churchill Downs announced that a race named in Blame's honor would be run beginning in May 2020 — The Blame Stakes, a prep race for the $500,000 Stephen Foster Stakes (G2) June 27 at Churchill Downs.

The event was inaugurated on 23 May 2020 and run over a distance of one mile and was won by Rupp Racing's Owendale. 
Owendale starting as second favorite at odds of 7/2 was ridden by jockey Florent Geroux who settled last from the gate, was in the seven path into the lane, rallied down the stretch while widest and edged past three wide in the final stages to win by half a length over longshot Everfast in a time of 1:34.74.

In 2021, the distance for the event was increased to  mile.  

In 2023 the event was upgraded by the Thoroughbred Owners and Breeders Association to a Grade III.

Records
Speed record
 miles: 1:48.54 – Dynamic One   (2022)

Margins
 1 length  – Dynamic One   (2022)

Most wins by a jockey
 No jockey has won the event more than once

Most wins by a trainer
 No trainer has won the event more than once

Most wins by an owner
 No owner has won the event more than once

Winners

See also
 List of American and Canadian Graded races

References

2020 establishments in Kentucky
Churchill Downs horse races
Graded stakes races in the United States
Grade 3 stakes races in the United States
Recurring sporting events established in 2020